Park Yeong-hun (born April 1, 1985), also known as Park Young-hoon and Pak Yeong-hoon, is a South Korean professional Go player.

Biography
Park Yeong-hun was born in Seoul. He is a professional Go player in the Hanguk Kiwon.

He is the youngest ever Korean 9 dan, promoted when he was only 19 years old. Due to the new rules set by the Hanguk Kiwon, Park moved up from 1 dan to 9 in only 4 years 7 months, which is the fastest progress ever.

Much of this was due to him winning the Fujitsu Cup in 2004, when he was at 4 dan. This also earned him exemption from military service.

His hobbies include tennis and playing Tetris.

Titles and runners-up
He ranks #8 in total number of titles in Korea.

References
 GoGod Encyclopedia

External links
 Page at Gobase
 Page at Sensei's Library
 Interview
 Article about Park Younghun and Lee Younggu at Go Game Guru

1985 births
Living people
South Korean Go players